Royale Furniture Holdings Limited is one of the largest furniture manufacturers and wholesalers in China. It offers its furniture products in "Shunde Empire Furniture" in Shunde, Guangdong, the biggest furniture wholesale market in China.

History
The company was founded in 1997. It was formerly known as Chitaly Holdings Limited and changed its name to the current name in 2007. It is headquartered in Hong Kong and Shunde.

References

External links
Royale Furniture Holdings Limited

Companies listed on the Hong Kong Stock Exchange
Companies established in 1997
Companies based in Foshan
Privately held companies of China
Furniture companies of China
Hong Kong brands